Walter Robinson is an American composer of the late 20th century. He is most notable for his 1977 song Harriet Tubman, which has been recorded by folk musicians such as Holly Near, John McCutcheon, and others.  He is also the composer of several operas.

References 

American composers